

Route designations 
1–89 – local routes in various areas of the city
40X–88X – express routes (specifically designated with an X) from uptown to various park and ride lots
90–99 – Circulator routes in North Mecklenburg (and formerly Matthews/Mint Hill) that will deviate for pick ups up to 3/4 of a mile from the route with advanced notice.
200–299 – community circulator routes
501 – LYNX Blue Line (though not generally listed for users)

List of routes

Former routes

References

External links 
Charlotte Area Transit System Routes and Schedules

Charlotte Area Transit System
Charlotte